The Spacek SD-1 Minisport is a Czech amateur-built aircraft, designed by Igor Špaček and produced by Spacek sro of Hodonin. The aircraft was also produced for a short time in the United States by SkyCraft Airplanes of Orem, Utah as a light-sport aircraft, but they had gone out of businesses by 2017. The aircraft is supplied in the form of plans, as a kit for amateur construction, or as a ready-to-fly aircraft.

Design and development
The aircraft features a cantilever low-wing, a single-seat enclosed cockpit, fixed conventional landing gear or optionally tricycle landing gear, a T-tail and a single engine in tractor configuration. Due to its very light weight it can qualify for the German 120 kg category. It complies with the United Kingdom SSDR rules for single seat deregulated microlight aeroplanes.

The aircraft is made from wood, with judicious use of composites, including for the wing spar. Engines of  can be used. The Rotax 447, Hirth 2702, Zanzottera MZ 201, Simonini Victor 1 Super, 2si 460 and Half VW can also be used.

By November 2015 113 had been sold worldwide and about 41 were flying.

At the end of May 2014 SkyCraft Airplanes announced that light-sport flight testing on its version had been completed. Their model has a revised cockpit, including Dynon SkyView instrumentation, a hydraulic brake system and the  Hirth F-23 two-stroke fuel-injected engine. The company's intention was that 12 aircraft would be built for the first production run. However, as of 7 August 2017 the SD-1 was still not on the Federal Aviation Administration's list of accepted light-sport aircraft.

Variants

SD-1 TD
Conventional landing gear (taildragger) version
SD-1 TG
Tricycle gear version
SD-1 TD XL
Conventional landing gear (taildragger) version for taller pilots
SD-1 TG XL
Tricycle gear version for taller pilots
SD-2 SportMaster
 2-seat tricycle gear version

Accidents
In September 2013, during a test and evaluation flight of the sole example flying in the United States, the pilot lost control while flying aerobatics not approved for the aircraft type and the aircraft crashed. The ballistic parachute did not deploy properly, most likely due to be out of limits for deployment, and the pilot was killed.

Specifications (SD-1)

See also
Similar aircraft
Mini Coupe
Sonex Aircraft Onex
Corby Starlet
Pazmany PL-4
Mooney M-18 Mite

References

External links

Homebuilt aircraft
Single-engined tractor aircraft